57th Regiment or 57th Infantry Regiment may refer to:

 57th (West Middlesex) Regiment of Foot, a disestablished unit of the British Army 
 57th Infantry Regiment (Philippine Commonwealth Army), a unit of the Philippine Commonwealth Army during the Second World War from 1941 to 1946 
 57th Infantry Regiment (United States), a unit of Philippine scouts serving under United States command during World War II 
 57th Infantry Regiment (Ottoman Army), a unit of the Ottoman Army during WWI
 57th Line Infantry Regiment a unit of the French Army
 57th Field Artillery Regiment (2nd/10th Dragoons), RCA, a unit of the Canadian Army
 57th Infantry Regiment (United States), a unit of the US Army

 American Civil War
Union (North) Army
 57th Illinois Volunteer Infantry Regiment
 57th Indiana Infantry Regiment
 57th New York Volunteer Infantry
 57th Ohio Infantry
 57th Pennsylvania Infantry
 57th United States Colored Infantry

Confederate (Southern) Army
 57th Virginia Infantry

See also
 57th Division (disambiguation)